This is a list of medical wikis, collaboratively-editable websites that focus on medical information. Many of the most popular medical wikis take the form of encyclopedias, with a separate article for each medical term. Some of these websites, such as WikiDoc and Radiopaedia, are editable by anyone, while others, such as Ganfyd, restrict editing access to professionals. The majority of them have content available only in English.

The largest and most popular general encyclopedia, Wikipedia, also hosts a significant amount of health and medical information.

Open licensed

Clinfowiki

Clinfowiki is devoted to topics in biomedical informatics and is maintained by the Department of Medical Informatics & Clinical Epidemiology at Oregon Health and Science University. Dean F. Sittig launched the site on 27 June 2005, and  Vishnu Mohan was its editor.

Radiopaedia

Radiopaedia is a wiki-based international collaborative radiology educational resource with reference articles, radiology images, and patient cases. It is aimed at registrars, residents and consultant radiology staff. An iPhone/iPad application was released in 2009.

Users of the site are free to add and edit content as well as to maintain their own case library. In an attempt to reduce vandalism and peer-review content, an editorial team moderates changes to ensure that the presented material is as accurate and relevant as possible.

WikiAnesthesia

WikiAnesthesia is a collaboratively-developed anesthesia knowledge base whose educational mission is to provide the global anesthesia community with a free, open-access, crowd-sourced repository of anesthesia knowledge. Content is provided by anesthesia providers and covers a wide range of topics in the field of anesthesiology.

WikiDoc

WikiDoc (alternatively spelled Wiki Doc) is a medical wiki encyclopedia where contributors are not required to have credentials in a biomedical field. WikiDoc was started in December 2005 by C. Michael Gibson, of Harvard Medical School. The original content came from Gibson's chief residency notes, board review notes, and content from a variety of copyleft sources including The U.S. National Library of Medicine, the U.S. Centers for Disease Control, Wikipedia, and Ask Dr Wiki. WikiDoc differs from Wikipedia in the following ways: it is oriented more to medical professionals, and has medical news, a toolbar to search internet on the right hand side to gather articles, guidelines and slides, a toolbar on the left to see what page most people looked at next, and a board review course (in Beta testing).

WikEM

WikEM is a wiki-based website and mobile application oriented towards emergency medicine clinicians. It started as a database created from notes and checklists of residents at the Harbor-UCLA emergency medicine residency program, but is now open to all clinical providers. WikEM was launched in 2009. Its mobile application is available for iOS and Android, and functions in an offline environment. It calls itself The Global Emergency Medicine Wiki.

WikiLectures

WikiLectures is a collaborative project focused on creating and storing medical study materials. It is developed by students and teachers from various Czech and Slovak medical faculties. WikiLectures is part of the project MEFANET, a network linking medical schools in the Czech Republic and Slovakia.

Editors of WikiLectures take care of promoting the authors, editorial process contributions, technical support, WikiLectures structure and ensure the safety of the project. WikiLectures contain articles, notes, prepared exam topics, guides for practitioners, and study books. WikiLectures are constantly growing. The articles are written by medical students, faculty professionals and doctors. The administration and security is provided by the editorial board. Articles in WikiLectures are regularly checked by editors and experts in various branches of medicine. Articles checked by teachers are always marked by a special sign.

WikiMSK 

WikiMSK is dedicated to musculoskeletal medicine, and is based in New Zealand. It is affiliated with the New Zealand College of Musculoskeletal Medicine (NZCMM), and is physician directed. It is designed around a peer review process and currently only members of the NZCMM are able to create and edit articles. The majority of the content is open access to unregistered users.

Wikimedica 

Wikimedica is a general evidence based medical wiki. Based in Canada, it aims at providing French language health professionals with an open access and dynamic knowledge base to allow for better and more accurate patient care. The wiki is open to all for reading but can only be edited by professionals.

It makes use of Semantic MediaWiki to structure medical knowledge for the Semantic Web, expert systems and artificial intelligence applications.

Closed licensed

EyeWiki

EyeWiki is a medical wiki community and online medical wiki encyclopedia, launched in July 2010 by ophthalmologists supported by the American Academy of Ophthalmology. The wiki provides information about eye diseases and their management, including medical and surgical treatments.

EyeWiki content is created and edited only by ophthalmologists and ophthalmologists in training.

HemOnc.org

HemOnc.org is a hematology/oncology wiki which was originally created by oncologists to provide information about chemotherapy regimens and hematology/oncology medications. Its contributors are practicing physicians and other medical professionals. Its current focus is to provide clinicians referenced information about chemotherapy regimens, medications used in hematology/oncology, and to allow medical professionals to share any useful references or medical information with each other to improve their clinical & academic practice.

HemOnc.org runs on MediaWiki software and also Semantic MediaWiki. Anyone may sign up for an account and suggest additional information to be added. Editing privileges are activated for account holders whose credentials are verified. The content is not under an open license.

Data about HemOnc.org has been presented at the 2013 ASCO Quality Care Symposium, and it has been profiled in the oncology press. The website's chemotherapy regimen database has also been used for academic research projects.

WikiSM 

WikiSM is an open access sports medicine wiki. They welcome all sports medicine physicians and other members of the sports medicine team (including allied health) to register and become contributors.

Defunct

AskDrWiki

AskDrWiki was a medical wiki encyclopedia created by Cleveland Clinic Cardiology Fellows Kenny Civello and Brian Jefferson. The project was started as a response to the lack of free online medical information found in several community hospitals and was created to form a repository of cardiovascular information that could be readily accessed for reference. It was launched in August 2006. The site now holds medical review articles, clinical notes, pearls, and medical images. The wiki allows anyone with a medical background to contribute or edit medical articles, of which there are over 2,000 .

The purpose of the site was to provide reliable and easily accessed health information for the medical community including physicians, nurses, and medical students. The information published on the site is not meant to supersede medical training but to serve as a repository of medical review articles to give medical professionals an online source where they can review medical topics. The website is similar to Wikipedia because it runs on MediaWiki software allowing users to add and edit articles, but differs in that all users must be credentialed based on their medical training before they are allowed to publish. Its goal is not to compete with Wikipedia regarding consumer health-related topics, but to serve as an expert medical wiki and provide a source of up-to-date medical information for healthcare providers.

In December 2006, AskDrWiki was referenced in a British Medical Journal article, "How Web 2.0 is Changing Medicine", as one of the early adopters of using video hosting sites such as YouTube and Google Video to host medical videos. It was also discussed in a 2007 Nature Medicine article on medical wikis. AskDrWiki has been featured in other media including The Plain Dealer, Medical Economics and The American Medical Association News.

As of February 2015, although still online, the wiki had minimal ongoing contributions, with only 3 edits in 2014. As of March 2022 the site was down.

Ganfyd

Ganfyd was a medical wiki community and encyclopedia, created in November 2005 by a group of doctors working in the United Kingdom. Only registered medical practitioners or persons working under their direction, and a small number of invited non-medical specialists, could edit Ganfyd articles. The intention was to make the material reliable enough for professional medical use.  it has over 8000 content pages. As of May 2020 it is no longer active.

Medcyclopaedia
Medcyclopaedia,  The Encyclopaedia of Medical Imaging, was a wiki encyclopedia of medical imaging used in radiology and radiography. As of December 2012, the site no longer exists.

The encyclopedia was the result of a collaboration of the Nycomed Amersham Intercontinental Continuing Education in Radiology Institute (NICER Institute), Sweden, Department of Radiology, Lund University, Sweden, and Amersham Health, Oslo, Norway. It was provided and copyrighted by the healthcare unit of General Electric corporation. Retrieval of images (other than thumbnails) required registration.

The website contained 3,600 pages before closing down.

Medpedia

Medpedia was a collaborative project launched on 17 February 2009. Its aim was to create an open access medical wiki encyclopedia in association with Harvard Medical School, Stanford School of Medicine, Berkeley School of Public Health, University of Michigan Medical School, the United Kingdom's National Health Service (NHS) as well as other contributors. Content was licensed under the Creative Commons Attribution-ShareAlike (CC-BY-SA) license and ran on modified MediaWiki software. Harvard Medical School did not have a role in, nor was it responsible for, the content that appeared in the “wiki” section of Medpedia.

Anyone with medical knowledge was welcome to become part of Medpedia's community. However, to qualify to edit or contribute to the main content, approved editors needed an M.D., D.O., or Ph.D. in a biomedical field. Others could contribute by writing in suggestions for changes to the site using the "Make a suggestion" link at the top of each page. An approved editor could review and potentially add submitted suggestions.

Medpedia was composed of three primary components:
 A collaborative encyclopedia (also referred to as the "knowledge base")
 A Network & Directory for health professionals and organizations
 Communities of Interest where medical professionals and non-professionals come together to discuss topics of interest.

A 2012 literature review of 50 academic journal articles about the use of social media by clinicians remarked that Medpedia had "launched in 2009 with substantial institutional backing" but that the authors "did not find articles reporting success metrics" for it.

Around January 2013 the site abruptly closed. Medpedia's founder James Currier acknowledged that this was permanent in a blog post in July 2013.

WikiSurgery

WikiSurgery is a collaboratively-built online encyclopedia hosted by the International Journal of Surgery. As of November 2013, the site's homepage is still up but none of the rest of the website is viewable.

See also
Health information on Wikipedia
Health information on the Internet

References

Encyclopedias of medicine
Online encyclopedias
Wiki communities

 List
Wikis by genre
Lists of websites